In quantum mechanics, a triplet is a quantum state of a system with a spin of quantum number =1, such that there are three allowed values of the spin component,  = −1, 0, and +1.

Spin, in the context of quantum mechanics, is not a mechanical rotation but a more abstract concept that characterizes a particle's intrinsic angular momentum. It is particularly important for systems at atomic length scales, such as individual atoms, protons, or electrons.

Almost all molecules encountered in daily life exist in a singlet state, but molecular oxygen is an exception. At room temperature, O2 exists in a triplet state, which can only undergo a chemical reaction by making the forbidden transition into a singlet state. This makes it kinetically nonreactive despite being thermodynamically one of the strongest oxidants. Photochemical or thermal activation can bring it into the singlet state, which makes it kinetically as well as thermodynamically a very strong oxidant.



Two spin-1/2 particles 
In a system with two spin-1/2 particlesfor example the proton and electron in the ground state of hydrogenmeasured on a given axis, each particle can be either spin up or spin down so the system has four basis states in all

using the single particle spins to label the basis states, where the first arrow and second arrow in each combination indicate the spin direction of the first particle and second particle respectively.

More rigorously

Since for spin-1/2 particles, the  basis states span a 2-dimensional space, the  basis states span a 4-dimensional space.

Now the total spin and its projection onto the previously defined axis can be computed using the rules for adding angular momentum in quantum mechanics using the Clebsch–Gordan coefficients. In general

substituting in the four basis states

returns the possible values for total spin given along with their representation in the  basis. There are three states with total spin angular momentum 1:

which are symmetric and a fourth state with total spin angular momentum 0:

which is antisymmetric. The result is that a combination of two spin-1/2 particles can carry a total spin of 1 or 0, depending on whether they occupy a triplet or singlet state.

A mathematical viewpoint 

In terms of representation theory, what has happened is that the two conjugate 2-dimensional spin representations of the spin group SU(2) = Spin(3) (as it sits inside the 3-dimensional Clifford algebra) have tensored to produce a 4 dimensional representation. The 4 dimensional representation descends to the usual orthogonal group SO(3) and so its objects are tensors, corresponding to the integrality of their spin. Thus the "three" in triplet can be identified with the three rotation axes of physical space.

See also 

 Singlet state
 Doublet state
 Diradical
 Angular momentum
 Pauli matrices
 Spin multiplicity
 Spin quantum number
 Spin-1/2
 Spin tensor
 Spinor

References

Quantum mechanics
Rotational symmetry
Spectroscopy